Atlético Sanluqueño Club de Fútbol is a Spanish football team based in Sanlúcar de Barrameda, Province of Cádiz, in the autonomous community of Andalusia. Founded in 1948, although its registration in official competitions took place in 1951. It plays in Primera División RFEF – Group 2, holding home games at Estadio El Palmar, with a capacity of 5,000 seats.

History 
On 11 January 1951 the club was founded with Rafael Bartel Velázquez as its president. Ricardo Jiménez González became the secretary of the club.

Season to season

1 season in Primera División RFEF
11 seasons in Segunda División B
38 seasons in Tercera División

Current squad

Notable players
 Marc Cardona
 Nolito
 George Cabrera
 Abel Gómez
 Dani Güiza

References

External links
Official website 
Futbolme team profile 
Club & stadium history Estadios de España 

Football clubs in Andalusia
Association football clubs established in 1948
1948 establishments in Spain
Primera Federación clubs
Province of Cádiz
Football clubs in Spain